Horavar (also, Goravar and Gorovar) is a village and municipality in the Yardymli Rayon of Azerbaijan.  It has a population of 820.

References 

Populated places in Yardimli District